Ray Anderson is the athletic director at Arizona State University since January 2014.  He graduated from Stanford University, where he lettered in football and baseball, and Harvard Law School.

Sports Administration Career
Anderson has managed NFL football operations starting in 2006 and has served as vice president of the Atlanta Falcons. On January 9, 2014, he was announced as the athletic director of the Arizona State Sun Devils. During his time as athletic director, Anderson oversaw the $268 million renovation to Sun Devil Stadium and the construction of Mullett Arena.  He also negotiated an eight-year, $38 million apparel agreement with Adidas, and added four varsity sports: men’s hockey, women’s lacrosse, triathlon, and men’s tennis. 

In February 2021, Anderson received a five-year extension that runs until 2026.  That extension made Anderson the second-highest paying athletic director in the country just behind of Chris Del Conte, the athletic director of the Texas Longhorns.

References

External links
 

Year of birth missing (living people)
Place of birth missing (living people)
Living people
African-American college athletic directors in the United States
Arizona State Sun Devils athletic directors
Stanford Cardinal baseball players
Stanford Cardinal football players
Harvard Law School alumni
21st-century African-American people